America, also called Love and Sacrifice, is a 1924 American silent historical war romance film. It describes the heroic story of the events during the American Revolutionary War, in which filmmaker D. W. Griffith created a film adaptation of Robert W. Chambers' 1905 novel The Reckoning. The plot mainly centers itself on the Northern theatre of the war in New York, with romance spliced into the individual movie scenes.

Plot 
The story shifts between the British Army in Northern New York, and the colonial patriots in Massachusetts and Virginia. Much later in the film in New York, a little remembered sub-plot takes place. British Captain Walter Butler (Lionel Barrymore), a ruthless Loyalist, leads the Iroquois Native Americans in viciously barraging attacks against the settlers, including the massacre of women and children, who are siding with the Revolution.

In Lexington, Massachusetts, Nathan Holden (Neil Hamilton) works as an express rider and minute man for the Boston Committee of Public Safety. At a mission to deliver a dispatch to the Virginia General Assembly, he meets Nancy Montague (Carol Dempster) and falls in love with her, but her father Justice Montague (Erville Alderson), a Loyalist judge, is not impressed with the rider. Captain Butler tries unsuccessfully to court Nancy. Nathan and Nancy declare that regardless of which side he fights for, they will always love each other. While visiting in Massachusetts, Justice Montague is accidentally shot by Nathan Holden. Nancy Montague's brother, Charles Montague (Charles Emmett Mack), is influenced by George Washington's heroism and decides that he wants to support the colonists. However, he dies shortly after being wounded at the Battle of Bunker Hill. Nancy hides the truth from her father when she tells him that her brother died fighting for the crown.

Nancy and her father travel to Mohawk Valley New York to the home of her Uncle Ashleigh Montague while Holden visits George Washington (Arthur Dewey) at Valley Forge. He gets sent to New York with Morgan's raiders to settle down the Native American attacks up north.  Butler occupies the Montague estate. His men kill Montague's brother and he arrests Montague and takes Nancy prisoner. Holden arrives to spy on Butler and overhears his plans for a massacre attack. He leaves to sound the alarm, reluctantly leaving Nancy behind with Butler. Butler plans to force himself on Nancy, but the Native Americans decide to attack immediately and Butler is compelled to join them. Nancy escapes when Butler leaves for the battle, and she and Montague reach the fort safely before the attack. The attackers mount ruthless attack on the fort, ultimately breaching the walls and killing many settlers. The Morgan's raiders arrive and liberate the fort, saving the lives of Montague and Nancy. A separate group of militia and Native Americans chase down and kill Butler, putting a stop to his plan. Montague believes in Holden's worth, and allows him and Nancy to be together. The film concludes with the surrender of General Cornwallis at the Battle of Yorktown and the presidential inauguration of George Washington.

Cast

Production
In 1923, the Daughters of the American Revolution petitioned Motion Picture Production Association President Will H. Hays to make a historical epic about the American Revolution, and Hays convinced D.W. Griffith to direct the film. Griffith prepared for the film by visiting historic battlefields and meeting with historical societies such as the DAR, the Sons of the Revolution, the Smithsonian Institution, the New York Public Library, the Lexington Historical Society, the Mount Vernon Ladies' Association, and the Massachusetts Historical Society.

Casting
Griffith used many popular movie actors at the time, but he felt that there was no need for them to play the roles in his films, and could not afford most of them anyway, after they began to consume nearly all of his money in expensive productions. As a result, Lillian Gish, who acted in a well known film of his, Orphans of the Storm, departed him after he could not pay any more for her services, and left him with Carol Dempster, who had far less appeal than Gish. She showed very little on-camera allure with Neil Hamilton, and only good with reaction scenes and had limited facial expressions. Additionally United States Armed Forces personnel were used as extras.

Filming
Filming took place at Richmond, Virginia and Somers, New York. During filming, a soldier's arm was blown off. As Charles Emmett Mack recalled, "Neil Hamilton and I went to neighboring towns and raised a fund for him—I doing a song and dance and Neil collecting a coin."

Reception

Box office
The film was screened to President Calvin Coolidge before its release, and the United States Army used it for recruitment purposes. However, America did not receive as large an audience as Griffith's previous films did. It is possible that the director had trouble differentiating between the colonists and British, since they both held origins to Great Britain. The audience is not clearly shown who are the antagonists and the protagonists. In addition, the movie's time frame was not rational. The film's time period made for a very long romance for Nancy and Holden before they could actually be together, since the first scenes were in 1775, but concluded in 1789. Its failure was perplexing, despite heavy promotion, considering Griffith spent over a million dollars on the production.

Criticism 
The film's climax was very original and thrilling, as in most other Griffith films, complete with action and exciting stunts in the rescue scenes. However, film critics described the motion picture as lacking in modernity of the time. The movie was unlike the other films of the time, at its original release. The story did not quite fit together as a whole and the order of which scenes were presented in was very confusing to follow, but was rather effective in individual scenes. The usage of title captions was also criticized. There would be a block of text explaining motifs and character relationships rather than having the characters display them through their acting, which is not made clear on screen.

The film was not completely useless to Griffith, but he was still in debt with massive amounts of money and did not receive that boost of attention he was hoping for.

See also
The Reckoning (1908)
The Heart of a Hero (1916)
Cardigan (1922)
 List of films about the American Revolution
 List of television series and miniseries about the American Revolution

References

External links 

America(part 1) available for free download from Internet Archive
America(part 2) available for free download from Internet Archive

1924 films
American silent feature films
American black-and-white films
1924 romantic drama films
Films directed by D. W. Griffith
Films shot in Massachusetts
Films shot in New York (state)
Films shot in Virginia
American Revolutionary War films
Films based on American novels
Films based on historical novels
Films based on works by Robert W. Chambers
American historical romance films
1924 war films
American war films
Cultural depictions of George Washington
Cultural depictions of Thomas Jefferson
Cultural depictions of George III
Cultural depictions of Samuel Adams
Cultural depictions of John Hancock
Cultural depictions of Patrick Henry
Films set in New York (state)
Films set in Massachusetts
Films set in Virginia
Articles containing video clips
1920s American films
Silent American drama films